William Scarlett may refer to:
 William Scarlett (bishop), bishop of the Episcopal Diocese of Missouri
 William Scarlett, 3rd Baron Abinger, British peer and soldier
 William Anglin Scarlett, Colony of Jamaica judge

See also
 Will Scarlet, member of Robin Hood's Merry Men